Sven Ušić (born 19 August 1959) is a former Croatian professional basketball player and coach. At a height of 2.01 m (6'7") tall, he played as a small forward.

Career
Ušić started his career in his native Pula, playing for KK Gradine Pula. He moved to Cibona in 1976, and initially found tough competition in the club. One night, at the beginning of his time at Cibona, Ušić was locked in the locker room by mistake before the game. Ušić started warming up for the game between the locker room's benches, and somebody soon came back for him. He entered the game and played well, shooting 12 times and hitting every time. After the game, coach Mirko Novosel jokingly told him that he would lock him up before every game.

Ušić has stated that he was helped a lot by Mirko Novosel, who noticed him and brought him to Zagreb.

In the 1979/80 season, Cibona reached the final of the FIBA Korać Cup, which they lost to AMG from Rieti. In the 1980/81 season they won the Yugoslav Cup. His Cibona played in the Cup Winners' Cup in 1981/82, which they won with a victory against Real Madrid in the final. They won the championship and cup of Yugoslavia both in the 1983/84 and 1984/85 seasons. He also won the European Champions Cup for two years in a row,   1985 and 1986. In the 1985/86 season Cibona convincingly won 1st place in the league, before the playoffs and the Yugoslav Cup. But they lost to Zadar in the end. Therefore, in the 1986/87 season, Cibona competed in the Cup Winners' Cup, which they won, beating Scavolini Pesaro in the final. In the same season, something similar happened in the championship and the cup: Cibona convincingly won the 1st place in the league, but in the playoffs they were surprised by the Serbian club Crvena Zvezda. Therefore, in the 1987/88 season they competed in the FIBA Korać Cup, losing to the Spanish club Real Madrid in the final.

National team career 
Ušić played for Yugoslavia at the European Championship in 1985, which the favored Yugoslavia, after two surprising defeats (CSSR, FR Germany), finished only 7th. He played 8 games in the competition, for a total of 1 minute and 1.8 points.

Personal life
He is the father of the Croatian volleyball player Senna Ušić.

In 2008, Ušić, a member of the management board of the volleyball club Azen, was accused of broadcasting the Ustaša song Jasenovac i Gradiška Stara by Croatian singer Thompson during a game between Azen and the Slovenian club HIT Nova Gorica, playing it during the time out, when music shouldn't have even been played. According to the hall manager, the former Cibona basketball player interfered with the release of the music, and then repeatedly warned him to move away from the CD player.

References 

1959 births
Living people
Croatian basketball coaches
Croatian men's basketball players
KK Cibona coaches
KK Cibona players
Yugoslav men's basketball players
Small forwards
Mediterranean Games medalists in basketball
People from Pula
KK Zadar players
KK Dubrava coaches